The Jardin botanique littoral Paul Jovet (2.5 hectares) is a nonprofit botanical garden located at 31, avenue Bernoville Gaëtan, Saint-Jean-de-Luz, Pyrénées-Atlantiques, Aquitaine, France. It is open several days per week in the warmer months; an admission fee is charged.

The garden was first envisioned in the 1980s by French botanist Paul Jovet (1896-1991) of the National Museum of Natural History in Biarritz. Its first landscaping and pond excavation took place in 1991, with first trees planted in 1996 and plant exchanges begun in 2003. In 2008 it opened to the public.

The garden focuses on regional flora and the seacoast's natural environment. It is set atop a rocky cliff about 50 meters above the Atlantic Ocean, conserves indigenous oak-pine forests and wetland areas, and provides a range of plant habitats for local flora. The grounds are organized as follows: magnolia collection, plants from five continents, useful garden, Atlantic oaks, rock garden, coastal heathland, cliff plants, botanical squares, dunes, wetlands, and coastal oak-pine forest.

See also 
 List of botanical gardens in France

References 
 Jardin botanique littoral Paul Jovet
 BGCI news article, "The Paul Jovet Botanical Garden opens its doors", May 29, 2008
 Développement durable article, February 27, 2008 (French)

Paul Jovet, Jardin botanique littoral
Paul Jovet, Jardin botanique littoral